In graph theory, the Poussin graph is a planar graph with 15 vertices and 39 edges. It is named after Charles Jean de la Vallée-Poussin.

History 
In 1879, Alfred Kempe published a proof of the four color theorem, one of the big conjectures in graph theory.
While the theorem is true, Kempe's proof is incorrect. Percy John Heawood illustrated it in 1890
with a counter-example, and de la Vallée-Poussin reached the same conclusion in 1896 with the Poussin graph.

Kempe's (incorrect) proof is based on alternating chains, and as those chains prove useful in graph theory mathematicians remain interested in such counterexamples.
More were found later: first, the Errera graph in 1921,
then the Kittell graph in 1935, with 23 vertices,
and finally two minimal counter-examples (the Soifer graph in 1997 and the Fritsch graph in 1998, both of order 9).

References

External links 
 Eric W. Weisstein, Poussin Graph (MathWorld)

Individual graphs